Lorenzo Dontez Brown (born August 26, 1990) is an American-born Spanish professional basketball player for Maccabi Tel Aviv of the Israeli Basketball Premier League and the EuroLeague.

High school career
Brown initially attended Centennial High School in his native Roswell, Georgia (United States). He averaged 20.8 points as a senior and was named a fourth-team Parade All-American and the Georgia 5A player of the Year. When he graduated on 2009, he was the No. 36 nationally and the No. 7 shooting guard overall by Rivals.com. After he graduated, he attended the Hargrave Military Academy in Chatham, Virginia.

College career

Brown, a 6'5" guard, played for NC State from 2010 to 2013.  He started all three seasons and led the Wolfpack to consecutive NCAA tournament appearances in 2012 and 2013.  As a junior, Brown averaged 12.4 points and 4.3 rebounds per game and led the Atlantic Coast Conference (ACC) in assists with 7.2 per game.  At the close of the season, Brown was named second team All-ACC. During his college career Brown averaged 11.6 points, 4.2 rebounds, 5.8 assists and 32.6 minutes per game.

After the 2012–13 season, Brown decided to forgo his final season of college eligibility and declared for the 2013 NBA draft.

Professional career

2013–14 season
Brown was selected with the 52nd overall pick in the 2013 NBA draft by the Minnesota Timberwolves and subsequently joined the team for the 2013 NBA Summer League. On September 26, 2013, he signed his first professional contract with the Timberwolves. However, he was waived by Timberwolves on October 25, 2013.

On November 1, 2013, he was acquired by the Springfield Armor. On November 20, 2013, he signed with the Philadelphia 76ers. He made his debut that same day, scoring 5 points with 58 seconds left in the 4th quarter. During his rookie season, he had multiple assignments with the Delaware 87ers. On March 14, 2014, he was waived by the 76ers. On March 16, 2014, he was re-acquired by the Springfield Armor.

2014–15 season
On July 29, 2014, he signed with Reyer Venezia of Italy for the 2014–15 season. On September 5, 2014, his contract was voided by Venezia after he failed physicals. On September 25, 2014, he signed with the Detroit Pistons. However, he was later waived by the Pistons on October 20, 2014. On November 1, 2014, he was acquired by the Grand Rapids Drive. On November 15, he made his debut for the Drive in a 112–103 loss to the Bakersfield Jam, recording 14 points, six rebounds and five assists in 33 minutes. On February 4, 2015, he was named to the Futures All-Star team for the 2015 NBA D-League All-Star Game.

On January 28, 2015, he signed a 10-day contract with the Minnesota Timberwolves. Three days later, in just his third game for the Timberwolves, he was thrown into the starting line-up due to being the only healthy point guard on the team as Mo Williams and Zach LaVine were both out injured. He was forced to play all but five seconds of their 90–106 loss to the Cleveland Cavaliers as he recorded 9 assists, 6 rebounds and 1 point. He moved back to the bench the following game on February 2 with the return of Ricky Rubio from long-term injury. His playing time drastically decreased as he managed just 1:29 minutes of action in the 94–100 loss to the Dallas Mavericks. On February 6, he signed a second 10-day contract with the Timberwolves. On February 19, 2015, he signed with the Timberwolves for the rest of the season. On October 24, 2015, he was waived by the Timberwolves.

2015–16 season
On November 12, 2015, Brown was reacquired by the Grand Rapids Drive. Two days later, he made his season debut in a 113–101 win over the Delaware 87ers, recording 13 points, two rebounds, two assists and three steals in 23 minutes off the bench.

On January 8, 2016, Brown signed a 10-day contract with the Phoenix Suns. He made his debut for the Suns four days later, recording 7 points, 5 assists, 2 rebounds and 1 steal in a 116–97 loss to the Indiana Pacers. On January 18, he signed a second 10-day contract with the Suns. After his contract expired, the Suns decided to not retain him, making him a free agent. On January 29, he was named in the East All-Star team for the 2016 NBA D-League All-Star Game, earning his second straight All-Star nod. On February 2, he was reacquired by the Grand Rapids Drive.

On March 18, 2016, Brown signed a 10-day contract with the Detroit Pistons. He later signed a second 10-day contract with the Pistons on March 28, and then for the rest of the season on April 13. Brown was waived by the Pistons on October 22, 2016 before playing in a game for them.

2016–17 season
On November 4, 2016, Brown signed a deal with Russian team UNICS Kazan, but his contract was voided on November 15 after failing a physical. On December 8, 2016, he signed a contract with the Zhejiang Golden Bulls of the Chinese Basketball Association to replace the injured Cady Lalanne. On March 3, 2017, following the conclusion of the 2016–17 CBA season, Brown was reacquired by the Grand Rapids Drive.

2017–18 season
Brown joined the Detroit Pistons for the 2017 NBA Summer League. He ultimately signed a two-way contract with the Toronto Raptors. Under the terms of the deal, split time between the Raptors and their G League affiliate, the Raptors 905. He also became the first player who previously had NBA experience to sign a two-way contract with an NBA team. He won the NBA G League Most Valuable Player Award for the season with Raptors 905. Prior to the close of the season, Brown's contract was upgraded to a standard deal.

2018–19 season
On July 20, 2018, the Raptors re-signed Brown. In 26 games for the team during the 2018–19 season, Brown averaged 2.1 points per game in 8.2 minutes per game. On January 7, 2019, the Raptors waived Brown. 

On February 10, 2019, Guangzhou Long-Lions of the Chinese Basketball Association was reported to have signed Brown. Brown made his debut for the Long-Lions two days later, scoring 17 points with 2 rebounds and a steal in a 97–93 victory over the Beijing Ducks.

2019–20 season
On August 3, 2019, KK Crvena zvezda announced that they had signed Brown.

2020–21 season
On July 14, 2020, he signed with Fenerbahçe Beko of the Turkish Basketball Super League. On June 17, 2021, Brown was released from the Turkish club.

2021–22 season
On July 23, 2021, Brown signed a one-year contract with UNICS Kazan. He left the team in early 2022 due to the 2022 Russian invasion of Ukraine, but returned later to finish the season.

2022–23 season
On June 29, 2022, Brown signed a two-year deal with Israeli club Maccabi Tel Aviv.

National team career
After being a naturalization target for Croatia, combo guard Brown was granted Spanish citizenship in early July 2022 ahead of EuroBasket 2022. Brown stated that the prospect of being coached at the Spain national team by Sergio Scariolo—whom he had previously collaborated with at the Toronto Raptors—was the deciding factor the player chose Spain.

He represented Spain at EuroBasket 2022, winning gold in the final against France. He was subsequently selected as a member of the All-Tournament Team.

Career statistics

NBA

Regular season

|-
| style="text-align:left;"| 
| style="text-align:left;"| Philadelphia
| 26 || 0 || 8.6 || .302 || .100 || .692 || 1.1 || 1.6 || .5 || .1 || 2.5
|-
| style="text-align:left;"| 
| style="text-align:left;"| Minnesota
| 29 || 7 || 18.9 || .426 || .214 || .632 || 2.4 || 3.1 || 1.0 || .2 || 4.2
|-
| style="text-align:left;"| 
| style="text-align:left;"| Phoenix
| 8 || 0 || 7.6 || .320 || .125 || .750 || .9 || 1.4 || .4 || .1 || 2.5
|-
| style="text-align:left;"| 
| style="text-align:left;"| Toronto
| 14 || 0 || 9.9 || .412 || .167 || 1.000 || 1.1 || .9 || .4 || .0 || 2.3
|-
| style="text-align:left;"| 
| style="text-align:left;"| Toronto
| 26 || 0 || 8.2 || .324 || .214 || 1.000 || 1.2 || 1.1 || .5 || .2 || 2.1
|- class="sortbottom"
| style="text-align:center;" colspan="2"| Career
| 103 || 7 || 11.5 || .364 || .170 || .707 || 1.5 || 1.8 || .6 || .1 || 2.8

Playoffs

|-
| style="text-align:left;"| 2018
| style="text-align:left;"| Toronto
| 4 || 0 || 7.3 || .300 || .400 || .500 || 1.5 || .5 || .0 || .3 || 2.3
|- class="sortbottom"
| style="text-align:center;" colspan="2"| Career
| 4 || 0 || 7.3 || .300 || .400 || .500 || 1.5 || .5 || .0 || .3 || 2.3

EuroLeague

|-
| style="text-align:left;"| 2019–20
| style="text-align:left;"| Crvena zvezda
| 27 || 27 || 25.1 || .459 || .288 || .823 || 3.3 || 4.6 || 1.1 || .4 || 12.3 || 13.0
|-
| style="text-align:left;"| 2020–21
| style="text-align:left;"| Fenerbahçe
| 37 || 12 || 22.5 || .470 || .327 || .804 || 2.2 || 3.5 || 1.3 || .0 || 9.5 || 8.6

College

|-
| style="text-align:left;"| 2010–11
| style="text-align:left;"| NC State
| 31 || 26 || 28.8 || .413 || .298 || .713 || 3.7 || 3.7 || 1.3 || .4 || 9.3
|-
| style="text-align:left;"| 2011–12
| style="text-align:left;"| NC State
| 37 || 37 || 34.3 || .450 || .351 || .729 || 4.5 || 6.3 || 1.8 || .5 || 12.7
|-
| style="text-align:left;"| 2012–13
| style="text-align:left;"| NC State
| 33 || 32 || 34.2 || .419 || .263 || .771 || 4.3 || 7.2 || 2.0 || .6 || 12.4
|- class="sortbottom"
| style="text-align:center;" colspan="2"| Career
| 101 || 95 || 32.6 || .429 || .305 || .741 || 4.2 || 5.8 || 1.7 || .5 || 11.6

References

External links

 NC State Wolfpack bio
 EuroLeague profile

1990 births
Living people
ABA League players
African-American basketball players
American expatriate basketball people in Canada
American expatriate basketball people in China
American expatriate basketball people in Serbia
American expatriate basketball people in Turkey
American men's basketball players
Basketball players from Georgia (U.S. state)
BC UNICS players
Delaware 87ers players
Fenerbahçe men's basketball players
Grand Rapids Drive players
Guangzhou Loong Lions players
KK Crvena zvezda players
Maccabi Tel Aviv B.C. players
Minnesota Timberwolves draft picks
Minnesota Timberwolves players
Naturalised citizens of Spain
NC State Wolfpack men's basketball players
Parade High School All-Americans (boys' basketball)
People from Roswell, Georgia
Philadelphia 76ers players
Phoenix Suns players
Point guards
Raptors 905 players
Shooting guards
Spanish expatriate basketball people in Turkey
Spanish expatriate basketball people in Serbia
Spanish expatriate basketball people in Russia
Spanish men's basketball players
Spanish people of American descent
Springfield Armor players
Sportspeople from Fulton County, Georgia
Toronto Raptors players
Zhejiang Golden Bulls players